Busman's Honeymoon (US: Haunted Honeymoon) is a 1940 British detective film directed by Arthur B. Woods. An adaptation of the 1937 Lord Peter Wimsey novel Busman's Honeymoon by Dorothy L. Sayers, Busman's Honeymoon stars Robert Montgomery, Constance Cummings, Leslie Banks, Googie Withers, Robert Newton and Seymour Hicks as Mervyn Bunter.

Plot summary

Newly married amateur detective Lord Peter Wimsey (Montgomery) and his wife, mystery writer Harriet Vane (Cummings), are looking forward to a quiet honeymoon at their new country cottage when they are reluctantly drawn into the investigation of a local murder.

Cast

 Robert Montgomery as Lord Peter Wimsey 
 Constance Cummings as Harriet Vane 
 Sir Seymour Hicks as Mervyn Bunter 
 Leslie Banks as Inspector Andrew Kirk 
 Robert Newton as Frank Crutchley 
 Googie Withers as Polly 
 Frank Pettingell as William George Puffett, The Sweep
 Joan Kemp-Welch as Aggie Twitterton
 Aubrey Mallalieu as Reverend Simon Goodacre
 James Carney as Constable Tom Sellon
 Roy Emerton as Noakes
 Louise Hampton as Mrs. Doris Ruddle
 Eliot Makeham as Simpson
 Reginald Purdell as MacBride
 Allan Whittaker as The Doctor
 Ben Williams as Town Inspector

Production
Location shooting on Busman's Honeymoon began 4 August 1939 with Richard Thorpe as the original director. After the outbreak of the Second World War, the film was "shelved" until March 1940 with Arthur B. Woods appointed as director. Principal photography took place from 21 March to mid-April 1940 at Denham Studios, as well as other locations in England.

Critical reception
Film critic Bosley Crowther in his review of Haunted Honeymoon, wrote in The New York Times, "Seldom has there been a film so pleasantly conducive to browsing as this leisurely, bookish fable of murder in Devonshire; not of late has there been one so steeped in the genteel tradition of British crime literature.  A glass of port, at least, should be taken along with it."

In a modern review, Britmovie wrote, "Americans Robert Montgomery and Constance Cummings aroused some national indignation when cast as such the essentially British sleuth Lord Peter Wimsey and his crime-writing bride Harriet Vane but they acquitted themselves satisfactorily, even though some of their thunder is stolen by a particularly colourful supporting cast that includes a morose Robert Newton, Seymour Hicks resourceful butler, Leslie Banks and Googie Withers".

References

Notes

Citations

Bibliography

 Maltin, Leonard. Leonard Maltin's Movie Encyclopedia. New York: Dutton, 1994. .

External links
 
 
 
 

1940 films
1940s crime comedy-drama films
British crime comedy-drama films
1940s English-language films
British detective films
Films directed by Arthur B. Woods
Films based on British novels
Metro-Goldwyn-Mayer films
British black-and-white films
Films set in London
Films shot at Denham Film Studios
1940s British films